Kamorudeen Adekunle Adedibu  was elected Senator for the Oyo South constituency of Oyo State, Nigeria, taking office on 29 May 2007. He is a member of the People's Democratic Party (PDP).

Adedibu is the son of late Oyo State power broker Lamidi Adedibu.
After taking his seat in Senate, he was appointed to committees on Industry (Chairman), Federal Character & Inter-Government Affairs, Employment, Labour & Productivity, Defence & Army  and Information and Media.
In a mid-term evaluation of Senators in May 2009, ThisDay noted that he had sponsored the Nigeria Industrial Development Authority Establishment Bill and had sponsored and co-sponsored some motions.
In a May 2009 interview he expressed pessimism about the state of the country, saying there were many problems to be faced. He accused the political elite of being dishonest and parochial.

References

Living people
Yoruba politicians
Peoples Democratic Party members of the Senate (Nigeria)
People from Oyo State
21st-century Nigerian politicians
Year of birth missing (living people)